Feng Xuefeng (2 June 190331 January 1976) was a Chinese writer and activist known for his contributions to socialist literary criticism, particularly as an authority on Lu Xun. Initially a prominent member of the Chinese Communist Party, he was accused of being a counter-revolutionary and he spent the last few decades of his life living under persecution. Feng died of lung cancer during the final year of the Cultural Revolution.

Early life
Feng was born in Yiwu, Zhejiang. He attended the Hangzhou Number One Teachers' College and was a member of its "Morning Light Society" (a literary society established by poet Zhu Ziqing). In 1925, Feng began studying Japanese at Peking University. He joined the Chinese Communist Party in 1927 and was both a founding member and the party secretary of the Left-wing Association of Chinese Writers.

Career
Beginning in the 1930s, Feng presented himself as an outspoken socialist literary critic. He was especially interested in the works of Lu Xun, which some of his colleagues regarded as archaic. In late 1937, Feng began writing a novel inspired by the Long March, titled Lu Dai zhi si, or Death of Lu Dai. The original 500,000-character manuscript was lost after he was captured and imprisoned by the Nationalist government in 1941. In contrast to the optimistic poetry that he had written in his youth, his later works, written in prison, expressed "the strong convictions of a Communist revolutionary".

Following the founding of the People's Republic of China, Feng was appointed as editor of both People's Literature and Literary and Art Gazette in 1951 and 1952 respectively. Believing that he was free to do so, he penned editorials critical of the government and was consequently labelled as a counter-revolutionary. As part of the Anti-Rightist Campaign which started in 1957, Feng was sentenced to re-education through labor, although he was acquitted in 1961. Having previously attempted to rewrite Death of Lu Dai in the early 1950s, he sought to write what would have been the only novel of his career for a third time. After being advised not to write on a "revolutionary subject" like the Long March, however, Feng reportedly burnt the entire manuscript.

Final years
Feng continued living under persecution in his final years and was again targeted by the government during the Cultural Revolution. He died of lung cancer in 1976—the final year of the Cultural Revolution.

References

Citations

Works cited

 
 
 

1903 births
1976 deaths
People from Yiwu
20th-century Chinese dramatists and playwrights
20th-century Chinese poets
20th-century Chinese writers
Deaths from lung cancer
Peking University alumni